Zayed University (ZU) is a public university based in the United Arab Emirates. It was established in 1998. It is one of the three government-sponsored higher education institutions in the United Arab Emirates. It is named in honor of Sheikh Zayed bin Sultan Al Nahyan, the country's first president.

Achieving accreditation by the Middle States Commission on Higher Education in the US, it became the first federal university in the UAE to be internationally accredited.
ZU offers 17 majors and 10 minors at undergraduate level and 10 master's degrees. The university has eight colleges: College of Arts and Creative Enterprises, College of Business, College of Communication and Media Sciences, College of Education, College of Humanities and Social Sciences, College of Natural and Health Sciences, College of Technological Innovation, and college of interdisciplinary studies.

History
Zayed University was established in 1998 by the Emirati federal government. Until 2008, the university was accepting only UAE national women, but after the opening of the Sweihan campus, a collaboration between Zayed University and the UAE Armed Forces, approximately 200 male students were admitted.

The university is currently engaged in cooperative relationships with a number of institutions throughout the world such as the Al-Maktoum Institute for Arabic and Islamic Studies in Scotland, Australian National University, School of Business Management and Organization of the Foundation Antonio Genovesi Salerno in Italy, Universidad Complutense de Madrid in Spain and Waseda University in Japan.

In 2018, the university was featured for the first time in the QS World Rankings at 701–750. Zayed University was ranked 20 out of 180 in the 2022 QS World University Arab Rankings.

Accreditation
In 2008, Zayed University announced that it had received accreditation from the Commission on Higher Education of the Middle States Association of Colleges and Schools. Zayed University announced it had received re-accreditation in 2013. The university is one of only 16 overseas institutions accredited by the MSCHE, and one of only 4 in the Middle East.

Through the Council for Accreditation of Educator Preparation Continuous Improvement Commission (CAEP), in 2013 the College of Education received accreditation by the National Council for Accreditation of Teacher Education.  Zayed University College of Education is the first university, outside of the US, to be internationally accredited.

Programs within its College of Arts and Creative Enterprises were recognized as substantially equivalent through NASAD in July 2015.

Colleges and academic programs

University College
University College delivers a standardized interdisciplinary General Education Program to all undergraduate students during their first two semesters at Zayed University and consists of four specialized departments that provide comprehensive support and instruction for students.

College of Arts and Creative Enterprises
Undergraduate Programs

 Bachelor of Fine Arts (B.F.A.) in Animation Design
 Bachelor of Fine Arts (B.F.A.) in Graphic Design
 Bachelor of Fine Arts (B.F.A.) in Interior Design
 Bachelor of Fine Arts (B.F.A.) in Visual Art
 Bachelor of Science (B.S.) in Multimedia Design

College of Business
Undergraduate Programs

 Bachelor of Science (B.S.) in Accounting
 Bachelor of Science (B.S.) in Finance
 Bachelor of Science (B.S.) in Human Resource Management
 Bachelor of Science (B.S.) in Marketing and Entrepreneurship

Graduate Programs

 Executive Master of Business Administration  
 Master of Science (M.S.) in Finance

College of Communication and Media Sciences
Undergraduate Programs

Bachelor of Science (B.S.) in Communication and Media Sciences with Concentrations in: 
 Integrated Strategic Communications
 Tourism and Cultural Communications
 Media Production and Storytelling

Graduate Programs

Master of Arts (M.A.) in Communication Concentrations in: 
 Tourism and Cultural Communication 
 Strategic Public Relations

College of Education

Undergraduate Program

 Bachelor of Science (B.S.Ed.) in Education with Concentration in Early Childhood Education (PreK-Grade 3)

Graduate Program

 Master of Education in Educational Leadership and Administration

College of Humanities and Social Sciences
Undergraduate Programs

Bachelor of Arts (B.A.) in International Studies with Concentrations in: 
 International Relations
 Middle East/Gulf Studies
 Political Economy & Development

Graduate Programs

 Masters in Diplomacy and International Affairs
 Master of Arts (M.A.) in Judicial Studies

College of Natural and Health Sciences
Undergraduate Programs

 Bachelor of Science (B.S.) in Public Health and Nutrition 
 Bachelor of Science (B.S.) in Environmental Science and Sustainability
 Bachelor of Science (B.S.) in Psychology

College of Technological Innovation
Undergraduate Programs

Bachelor of Science (B.S.) in Information Technology with Concentration in 
 Security and Network Technologies
 Web and Mobile Application Development
Bachelor of Science (B.S.) in Information System and Technology Management with Concentration in 
 Management Information Systems
 Enterprise Systems
 Business Intelligence

College of Interdisciplinary Studies 

Bachelors of Business Transformation with concentrations in
 Finance
 Accounting
 Operations Management
 Entrepreneurship & Innovation
 Growth Strategy & Management

Bachelors of Social Innovation with concentrations in
 Psychology
 Political & Economic Systems
 New Media
 Societal Design
 Behavioral Economics

Bachelors in Computational Systems with concentrations in

 Digital Security
 Machine Intelligence
 Applied Data Science

Bachelors in Sustainability with concentrations in

 Sustainability Enterprise
 Sustainability Policy
 Sustainability & Safety

Graduate programs
 Master of Science (M.S.) in Information Technology Concentration in Cyber Security

Student services

Student Accessibility Services

The Zayed University Student Accessibility Services Department provides support and equal education opportunities for students with diverse learning needs.

The Student Accessibility Services Department consists of three centers:

 Khalaf Al Habtoor Assistive Technology Resource Center, Dubai, established in 2012.
 Humaid Mater Al Tayer Assistive Technology Resource Center, Abu Dhabi, established in 2014.
 Abdul Wahid Al Rostamni Inclusive Learning Center, Dubai, established 2019.

Library

Zayed University has two libraries.

Curriculum Resources Center

The Curriculum Resources Center houses educational materials to support students within the College of Education and facilitate teacher training.

Emirates Collection

The Zayed University Emirates Collection houses materials about the United Arab Emirates and books by Emiratis authors.

The UAE Film Library and Archive

Established in 2013, The Film and Library Archive at Zayed University is the first of its kind in the region. The collection will act as a repository for the UAE film industry, preserve works by Emirati filmmakers and include films produced about the UAE. The collection also includes materials associated with filmmaking including posters, scripts, artwork, production stills, and press kits.

Archives and Records Management

The University Archives serves as the official repository for university records that are deemed to have “historical, administrative, academic legal, and/or fiscal value.”

Zayed University Learning Commons

The Zayed University Learning Commons collaborates with colleges to provide support in academic writing, language, mathematics, and study skills.

In 2011, the newly constructed Abu Dhabi Campus library was inaugurated  housing 150,000 books from the collection. At 40,000 sqm, the library is one of the largest in the Middle East.

Research
Zayed University supports faculty and student research through research training programs, fellowships and grants. In 2014, the university invested 4,687,269 AED in internal research funds.

Grants and fellowships
 Research Incentive Funds (RIF)  
This competitive grant funds faculty research over a period of one to two years and was designed to support and enhance the research culture at Zayed University. Researchers receive grants that range from a maximum of 30,000AED for individual one year projects to a maximum of 150,000AED for team grants.
 Provost's Research Fellowship Awards 
The Provost's Office provides support to faculty in the process of completing a major scholarly project. Six fellowships are granted per academic semester.
 Start-Up Grants for New Faculty  
This grants was designed to support newly hired faculty complete previously existing research projects or begin new research . Grants can range up to a maximum of 20,000AED for non-lab based projects and a maximum of 30,000AED for lab-based projects.
 Research Clusters 
A new initiative was established in 2016 to encourage cross-discipline collaboration among faculty. A maximum of 50,000AED per project is allocated.

Laboratories

College of Arts and Creative Enterprises 
 Fabrication Lab (3D Printing, Laser, prototype digital manufacturing)

College of Business 
 Bloomberg Finance Lab

College of Communication and Media Sciences 
 du Multimedia Labs

College of Natural and Health Sciences 
 Air Quality Lab  
 Aqueous Geochemistry Laboratory   
 Cognition and Neuroscience Lab * Microbiology Laboratory  
 Environmental Simulation and Remote Sensing Lab  
 Hydroponic Lab
 Hyperspectroscopy Lab  
 Instrumentation Lab 
 Marine Science Lab  
 Nutrient Analysis Laboratory  
 Organic Chemistry Lab

College of Technological Innovation 
 Advance Cyber Forensics Research Lab  
 Capstone Lab  
 Cisco Regional Academy Lab  
 Database Lab  
 Digital Forensics Lab  
 Enterprise Systems Lab  
 Game Development Lab  
 Graduate Lab  
 Hardware Lab  
 Human Computer Interaction Lab  
 Information Security Lab  
 Intelligent Remote Sensing and Tracking Lab  
 Multimedia Lab  
 Networking Lab  
 Operating Systems Lab  
 SMART Lab

Undergraduate research
The Undergraduate Research Scholars Program was launched in 2010 to encourage and support undergraduate student research. The competitive program provides students with faculty mentorship, workshops and lectures over a two and a half year period during the course of their studies. Students are expected to produce original research that is submitted to international academic journals at the end of the program.

Abu Dhabi campus

In 2009, Zayed University announced plans for the construction of a new campus in Abu Dhabi to meet the needs of a growing student population in the capital city. The campus was designed by German architect, Hadi Teherani, and inspired by the desert environment in which it would be constructed combining the modern and traditional to produce a striking complex with an iconic roof design. The campus was completed and operational in 2011. The new campus is located in Zayed City in Abu Dhabi and covers an area of 77 Hectares with a total built up area of 188,500sqm. The university complex consists of 28 building and facilities include “a 1,000-person theatre, a convention center, 400 seminar rooms and a four-story library with a tiered amphitheater design based on the US Library of Congress.

Dubai campus

The Zayed University Dubai campus moved to its current location in Al Ruwayyah, near Academic City, Dubai back in 2006. The original campus was near the northern end of the Abu Dhabi peninsula, on Delma Street.

Academic performance

Management Office
In December 2010, the Federal National Council queried the competency of the university's senior management. According to The National, Zayed University was reported to owe over Dh33 million in unpaid water and electricity bills.

According to The National, three people held the position of provost between April and June 2011, with a total of seven provosts between 1998 and 2011. This was confusing.

In 2012, the effectiveness of its teacher education program was questioned. According to The National, none of the 110 teachers it produced between 2010 and 2012 were employed by the Abu Dhabi Education Council (ADEC); ADEC allegedly claimed the university produced lazy and poorly skilled graduates.

 Following His Excellency Sheikh Nahyan bin Mubarak Al Nahyan, Maitha Al Shamsi was instated as president in 2013. Al Shamsi was followed by Her Excellency Sheikha Lubna Khalid Al Qasimi, who was appointed president in 2014.

As well as existing concerns over academic integrity, transparency, and plagiarism at Zayed University, concerns have been raised about the weak academic credentials and lack of international experience among the new management.

Legal concerns 
The professor, Matt J. Duffy, expressed concern that his activities-—which included writing for Gulf News, launching a student chapter of the Society of Professional Journalists, and teaching objectively about the U.A.E.'s media laws—-may have led to his dismissal. Despite claiming to follow Article 19 of the United Nations Universal Declaration of Human Rights in its MSCHE Self-Study ("Everyone has the right to freedom of opinion and expression; this right includes freedom to hold opinions without interference and to seek, receive, and impart information and ideas through any media regardless of frontiers"), the university would not comment on the case in public.

Materials deemed to be offensive are removed from the University Library, or are deposited in a locked holding space called Special Collections. Students must obtain faculty approval in order to access these materials, which include books on nursing, art magazines, human sexuality, and books containing views critical of religion. Librarians at Zayed University must consider censorship and culturally appropriate attitudes toward access and authority when teaching information literacy.

References

External links
 

 
Universities and colleges in the United Arab Emirates
Universities and colleges in the Emirate of Abu Dhabi
Educational institutions established in 1998
1998 establishments in the United Arab Emirates